"The Fields of Love" is a single released by ATB from his second studio album Two Worlds. It features the music group York who also included it on their album Experience, albeit in the 'Dubmix'.

After reaching the UK Top 20, the song featured on The New Pepsi Chart Album 2001 at place 20.

Track listing

The Fields of Love (Germany Release 1) 
 "The Fields of Love" (Airplay Mix) 3:41
 "The Fields of Love" (Original Club Mix) 6:24
 "The Fields of Love" (York Remix) 7:31
 "The Fields of Love" (Instrumental) 6:24

The Fields of Love (Germany Release 2)
 "The Fields of Love" (Airplay Mix) 3:45
 "The Fields of Love" (Public Domain Remix) 8:00
 "The Fields of Love" (Darude Remix) 7:26

The Fields of Love (US Release)
 "The Fields of Love" (Airplay Mix) 3:41
 "The Fields of Love" (Original Club Mix) 6:24
 "The Fields of Love" (York Remix) 7:31
 "The Fields of Love" (Darude Remix) 7:31
 "The Fields of Love" (Instrumental Club Mix) 6:24

The Fields of Love (Netherlands Release)
 "The Fields of Love" (Airplay Mix) 3:41
 "The Fields of Love" (Original Club Mix) 6:24

The Fields of Love (Canada Release)
 "The Fields of Love" (Airplay Mix) 3:41
 "The Fields of Love" (Original Club Mix) 6:24
 "The Fields of Love" (Remix) 7:31
 "The Fields of Love" (Darude Remix) 7:31
 "The Fields of Love" (Instrumental) 6:24
 "The Summer" (Airplay Mix) 3:49
 "The Summer" (Clubb Mix) 7:09
 "The Summer" (Instrumental) 6:30
 "The Summer" (Ibiza Influence) 5:31

Charts

Year-end charts

References

2000 singles
ATB songs
Songs written by André Tanneberger
2000 songs
Songs written by Torsten Stenzel